Amas de Casa Desesperadas (Colombian-Ecuadorian version) is one of the Latin-tailored versions of Desperate Housewives, the Emmy and Golden Globe award-winning American television comedy-drama series created by Marc Cherry. It debuted on 21 May 2007 on Teleamazonas and on 1 October 2007 on RCN TV.

Basic settings
The show takes place on the fictional street of Manzanares. It follows the lives of four women, seen through the eyes of their dead neighbor - as they work through domestic struggles while several mysteries unfold in the background.

Cast
 Ana Maria Orozco as Susana Martinez 
 Ruddy Rodríguez as Eugenia de Koppel (Season 1)
 Geraldine Zivic as Lina Yepes (Season 1)
 Sofía Vergara as Alicia Oviedo 
 Lorena Meritano as Veronica Villa 
 Marisol Romero as Gabriela Solis
 Carolina Gómez as Eugenia de Koppel (Season 2)
 Flora Martínez as Lina Yepes (Season 2)
 Diego Trujillo as Armando Koppel (who dies in Season 1)
 Diego Ramos as Miguel Delfino
 Víctor Mallarino as PabloOviedo
 Valeria Santa as Daniela Koppel
 Cristian Quezab as Andrés Koppel
 Valentina Acosta as Lucía Quiñónez
 Juan Manuel Gallego as Julián Oviedo
 Helena Mallarino as Felicidad Ruíz
 María Angélica Mallarino as Marta Ruíz
 Diana Guerrero Vélez as Domenica Koppet
 Julián Arango as Tomás Aguilar
 Rodrigo Guirao Díaz as Juan el Jardinero
 Juan Carlos Salazar as Carlos Solís
 Estefany Escobar as Alejandra Perreta
 Mario Moscoso as Leonardo Herrera
 María Cecilia Botero as Irene Peláez
 Tatiana Rentería as Luisa Quiñónez
 Jairo Camargo as Cristóbal Quiñónez

Writers and directors
 Production: Buena Vista International Television Latin America
 Production Companies: Pol-ka Productions (Argentina) and Vista Productions (Colombia)
 Countries: Colombia, Ecuador
 Colombian Executive Producers: Jaime Sánchez Cristo and Sofía Vergara
 Ecuadorean Executive Producers: Sebastián Corral and Claudia Cárdenas
 Direction: Sebastian Pivotto, Martin Desalvo
 General Direction: Víctor Mallarino
 Executive Production: Diego Andrasnik
 Executive Production Buena Vista International Television: Leonardo Aranguibel and Fernando Barbosa

External links

References

Comedy-drama television series
Desperate Housewives
2007 Colombian television series debuts
Non-American television series based on American television series
RCN Televisión original programming
Spanish-language television shows
Television shows set in Colombia
Television shows set in Ecuador